Osama Mounir (  ; born 25 February 1970) is an Egyptian radio personality and singer, he is current CEO of Express Media groups.

He hosts a radio program on Nogoom FM radio channel called "I, the stars and your love" (Arabic:أنا والنجوم وهواك), which is a program about love problems. Mounir also presented a short-lived TV talk show at NILE LIFE called Kol Lela (every night).

Early life 
He graduated from the Faculty of Arts at Ain Shams University, Department of Sociology, and began as a singer and has been singing since he was studying in high school, then he studied Arabic music and traveled to Australia, and after returning to Egypt he worked for a long time in the field of advertising, the he worked for Nogoom FM radio channel in 2002.

Discography 

 Haghanialek
 3esh 7yatak
 Ana

References

External links
 Osama Mounir official website
 Mahatet Masr Online Radio (Egyptian)
Osama Mounir on Twitter

Egyptian media personalities
Coptic Christians from Egypt
Living people
1970 births